Live at the Smell is a live album by American rock band The Babies. The album is limited edition, with only 100 copies made. It was dubbed by Kill/Hurt Records onto a blue C40 cassette and features artwork by Cali DeWitt of Teenage Teardrops.

Reception
"Now since I was at this show, and know how great it was, I won't go on and say how incredibly much I hate the Smell, which by the way, DOES smell, and say how fantastic this version of Breaking The Law is. Much more fast paced than on record, the Babies make this song into the most crazy, catchy singalong song that is as ramshackle as it is infectious." - Nu Rave Brain Wave

Track list

Personnel
The Babies
Kevin Morby – vocals, guitar
Cassie Ramone – vocals, guitar
Justin Sullivan – drums
Nathanael Stark - bass

Production and artwork
Chris Jahnle - engineer
Kat Bee - engineer
Cali DeWitt - artwork

References

External links

2011 live albums
The Babies albums